The 2008 Formula Renault 3.5 Series was the fourth Formula Renault 3.5 Series season. It began on 26 April in Monza, Italy and finished on 19 October in Barcelona, Spain after 17 races.

Regulation Changes

Technical
After a three-year cycle, the current Formula Renault 3.5 chassis was replaced by a brand new car built by Italian racecar constructor Dallara. The new car featured flex-fuel technology and could be powered by either premium unleaded petrol or E85 bioethanol, which was a first for this level of motorsport in Europe.

The car also featured a new carbon bodyshell, as well as a new shaped front wing, hollowed sidepods and multiple side deflectors designed to improve aerodynamic performance. However, several areas of the car, including the gearbox, rear suspension and carbon brakes, remained the same in order to keep costs under control.

The new car made its first public appearance on 21 September at the Magny-Cours round of the 2007 season, with development driver Andy Soucek demonstrating the car at the final round of the series in Barcelona.

Sporting

In a change from recent years, only 26 cars (thirteen two-car teams) were allowed into the 2008 championship. The World Series by Renault organising committee announced twelve of the thirteen teams on 5 October 2007, with newcomers Ultimate Signature confirmed as the final entrant on 12 October 2007.

The 2008 season also saw the introduction of a new qualifying system to the FR3.5 Series.
 The 26 cars will be split into two equal groups, with each having a 20-minute session
 The Top 6 drivers in each group (12 in total) will go forward to a 15-minute 'Super Pole' session
 The grid for Race one is decided by reversing the finishing order of the Top 8 drivers in Super Pole. They are followed by the last four in Super Pole (in finishing order) and the remaining 14 drivers in the order they finished qualifying
 For Race two, the Top 8 drivers from Super Pole line up in the order they finished the session, with the rest of the field decided by the finishing order of Race one

Teams and drivers

 = Series rookie for 2008

Race calendar and results
The calendar for the 2008 season was confirmed by Renault Sport on 9 January 2008. Seven rounds formed meetings of the 2008 World Series by Renault season, with additional rounds supporting the Monza 1000km and Monaco Grand Prix.

Season results
 Points for both championships were awarded as follows:

The maximum number of points a driver could earn each weekend (except Monaco) was 31 and the maximum number for a team was 55.

Drivers' Championship

 Polesitter for feature race in bold
 Driver in italics has been awarded two points for fastest lap
 † — Drivers did not finish the race, but were classified as they completed over 90% of the race distance.

Teams' Championship

References

External links

Formula Renault 3.5 Series
World Series Formula V8 3.5 seasons
2008 in European sport
Renault 3.5